Károly Olt (14 May 1904 – 22 March 1985) was a Hungarian politician, who served as Minister of Finance between 1950 and 1956.

He moved from Zagreb to Hungary in 1920 (after the Treaty of Trianon). He became a member of the Hungarian Communist Party in 1930. He was arrested and condemned because of his communist activities. After that Olt took part in the reestablishment of the communist party. Between 1947 and 1 June 1949 he served as Minister of Welfare. He was appointed Speaker of the National Assembly of Hungary in 1949. Between 1950 and 1951 he worked as secretary of the Presidential Council. After his financial ministership he was a member of the party's Central Leadership. Between 1957 and 1961 he was one of the members of the Presidential Council.

References
 Magyar Életrajzi Lexikon

1904 births
1985 deaths
Politicians from Zagreb
People from the Kingdom of Croatia-Slavonia
Hungarian Lutherans
Social Democratic Party of Hungary politicians
Hungarian Communist Party politicians
Members of the Hungarian Working People's Party
Members of the Hungarian Socialist Workers' Party
Finance ministers of Hungary
Speakers of the National Assembly of Hungary
Members of the National Assembly of Hungary (1945–1947)
Members of the National Assembly of Hungary (1947–1949)
Members of the National Assembly of Hungary (1949–1953)
Members of the National Assembly of Hungary (1953–1958)
Members of the National Assembly of Hungary (1958–1963)
Members of the National Assembly of Hungary (1963–1967)
20th-century  Hungarian economists
20th-century Lutherans
Hungarians of Croatia